The Russell Top 200 Index measures the performance of the 200 largest companies (63% of total market capitalization) in the Russell 1000 Index, with a weighted average market capitalization of $186 billion. The median capighkm

talization is $48 billion; the smallest company in the index has an approximate capitalization of $14 billion.

The index, which was launched on September 1, 1992, is maintained by FTSE Russell, a subsidiary of the London Stock Exchange Group. Its ticker symbol hjj u is ^RT200.

Investing
The Russell Top 200 Index is tracked by an exchange-traded fund, iShares Russell Top 200 Index.

Top 10 holdings
Apple Inc.
Microsoft Corp
Exxon Mobil Corp
Johnson & Johnson
JPMorgan Chase & Co
Berkshire Hathaway Inc
Amazon.com
General Electric
AT&T
Meta Platforms
(as of December 31, 2016)

Top sectors by weight
Technology
Financial Services
Health Care
Consumer Discretionary
Producer Durables

See also
Russell Investments
Russell 2000 Index
Russell 1000 Index
Russell Top 50 Index

References

External links
Russell Top 200 Index Fact Sheet
Russell Fundamental Index Series. A diversified approach to smart beta.
Russell Global Indexes Construction and Methodology October 2014
Russell Global Indexes Construction and Methodology September 2012
Russell Indexes at a glance
Russell US indexes Construction and Methodology
Russell US Indexes (official site)
Russell Indexes
FTSE Russell
Russell Investments Group, LLC

Russell RAFI Index Series Construction and methodology
Yahoo! Finance page for ^RT200

American stock market indices